(The new-born infant child), BWV 122, is a church cantata by Johann Sebastian Bach. Bach composed the chorale cantata in six movements in Leipzig for the Sunday after Christmas and first performed it on 31 December 1724.

History and text
The prescribed readings for the Sunday were from the Epistle to the Galatians, "through Christ we are free from the law", and from the Gospel of Luke, Simeon and Anna talking to Mary. The chorale cantata is based on a hymn by Cyriakus Schneegaß (1597) with the same title as the cantata. The librettist is unknown.

Bach first performed the cantata on 31 December 1724.

Scoring and structure
This work is scored for four vocal soloists (soprano, alto, tenor, and bass), a four-part choir, three recorders, two oboes, taille, two violins, viola, and basso continuo with organ.

The cantata has six movements:
Chorale: 
Aria (bass): 
Recitative (soprano): 
Aria (soprano, alto, tenor): 
Recitative (bass): 
Chorale:

Music
The opening chorus is a chorale fantasia with a long opening and closing ritornello bookending a chorale theme with four entries and lengthy interspersed episodes. The three lower voices imitate the soprano thrice in the chorale phrases and then move into a fast ascending figure.

The second movement is a lengthy and chromatic bass aria discussing  (sinning). This is the longest movement of the cantata. The continuo accompanying the vocal line is "tortuous and chromatically convoluted".

The soprano recitative is accompanied by a simple recorder trio, a combination designed to represent the "aura of the angels". As this is the only movement to include the recorders, the parts were likely performed by the oboe and taille players.

The fourth movement is a trio of the soprano, alto and tenor voices; the alto sings the chorale line with the strings while the soprano and tenor perform a duet aria. The movement is in D minor and  time.

The bass recitative begins in major before modulating to the G minor of the final movement. It is accompanied by high chordal strings and a continuo line.

The closing chorale is fast and short. It is in block form.

The "rather muted" music of the first chorus and the bass aria (the opening line of which translates as "O mortals, ye who sin daily") have been described by one writer as giving listeners a "moral hangover" after the possible overindulgence of the Christmas holidays.

Recordings
 Wiener Kammerchor / Vienna State Opera Orchestra. J. S. Bach: Cantatas BWV 122 and BWV 133. Vanguard Bach Guild, 1952.
 Frankfurter Kantorei / Bach-Collegium Stuttgart. Die Bach Kantate. Hänssler, 1972.
 Collegium Vocale Gent. J. S. Bach: Cantates de Nöel. Harmonia Mundi France, 1995.
 Bach: Cantates pour la Nativité / Intégrale des cantates sacrées Vol. 4, Eric J. Milnes, Montréal Baroque, Monika Mauch, Matthew White, Charles Daniels, Harry van der Kamp, ATMA Classique 2007
Amsterdam Baroque Orchestra & Choir, Ton Koopman J.S. Bach: Complete Cantatas, Vol. 13. Antoine Marchand, 2003.

Notes

References

External links
 
 Das neugeborne Kindelein BWV 122; BC A 19 / Chorale cantata (1st Sunday of Christmas) Bach Digital
 BWV 122 Das neugeborne Kindelein: English translation, University of Vermont
 
 Luke Dahn: BWV 122.6 bach-chorales.com

Church cantatas by Johann Sebastian Bach
1724 compositions
Chorale cantatas